Stanisław Konarski, Sch.P. (actual name: Hieronim Konarski; 30 September 1700 – 3 August 1773) was a Polish pedagogue, educational reformer, political writer, poet, dramatist, Piarist priest and precursor of the Enlightenment in the Polish–Lithuanian Commonwealth.

Konarski was born in Żarczyce Duże, Świętokrzyskie Voivodeship.  He studied from 1725 to 1727 at the Collegium Nazarenum in Rome, where he became a teacher of rhetoric. After that he travelled through France, Germany and Austria and Poland to broaden his education.

In 1730 he returned to Poland and began work on a new edition of Polish law, the Volumina legum.

From 1736 he taught at the Collegium Resoviense in Rzeszów. In 1740 he founded the Collegium Nobilium, an elite Warsaw school for sons of the gentry (szlachta). He founded the first public-reference library on the European mainland in 1747 in Warsaw. Thereafter he reformed Piarist education in Poland, in accordance with his educational program, the Ordinationes Visitationis Apostolicae... (1755). His reforms became a landmark in the 18th-century struggle to modernize the Polish education system.

Early on, Konarski was associated politically with King Stanisław Leszczyński; later, with the Czartoryski "Familia" and King Stanisław August Poniatowski. He participated in the latter's famous "Thursday dinners."  Stanisław August caused a medal to be struck in Konarski's honour, with his likeness and the motto, from Horace, Sapere auso ("Dare to know!"). Konarski argued very strongly that the right of veto that had traditionally been exercised by the Polish Nobility was not law but a custom.

In his most important work, the four-part O skutecznym rad sposobie albo o utrzymywaniu ordynaryinych seymów (On an effective way of councils or on the conduct of ordinary sejms, 1760-1763), he unveiled a far-reaching reform program for the Polish parliamentary system and political reorganization of the Commonwealth's central government, which included aiding the monarch with a permanent governing council.

Konarski died, aged 72, in Warsaw, Poland.  His heart is buried in an urn in the Piarist church in Cracow. His bust can be seen at the entrance to the crypt of this church placed on ulica Świętego Jana.

See also
 History of philosophy in Poland

References

External links
 Works by Stanisław Konarski in digital library Polona

1700 births
1773 deaths
Polish academics
Polish political writers
18th-century Polish–Lithuanian poets
18th-century Polish–Lithuanian dramatists and playwrights
Polish male dramatists and playwrights
Piarists
Polish Christian monks
18th-century Polish–Lithuanian Roman Catholic priests
Polish educational theorists
18th-century Polish nobility
Clan of Gryf
Polish male poets
Enlightenment philosophers
Age of Enlightenment
18th-century male writers
People from Jędrzejów County
18th-century Polish–Lithuanian philosophers
Polish Enlightenment